North Norfolk is a constituency represented in the House of Commons of the UK Parliament since 2019 by Duncan Baker, a Conservative.

Constituency profile
The seat covers a long stretch of the Norfolk coast including the seaside towns of Cromer, Wells-next-the-Sea and Sheringham.

History 
The North Division of Norfolk was first created by the Reform Act 1867 as one of three two-member divisions of the Parliamentary County of Norfolk.  Under the Redistribution of Seats Act 1885, the three two-member county divisions were replaced with six single-member divisions. The second version of this constituency was one of the single-member seats. It has remained as a single-member seat since then, being designated as a County Constituency from the 1950 general election.

Formerly held by Labour from 1945 to 1970, then the Conservatives from 1970 to 2001, the seat was represented by the Liberal Democrat Norman Lamb from 2001 until 2019; when the Conservatives regained the seat from the Lib Dems. The 2001 general election marked the first time that a Liberal aligned candidate had won a seat in Norfolk since 1929. This was to be followed by the election of Simon Wright in Norwich South in 2010. While Wright's success was short-lived (he was defeated in 2015), Lamb retained his seat, which at the 2015 election was one of only two Liberal Democrat seats in southern England, and one of only eight in the whole UK. At the 2017 general election, in which the Liberal Democrats lost five of their nine seats, North Norfolk was one of the four held.  Although the seat had been held by Labour for the 25 years following World War II, Labour have slumped to a distant third in recent years, and came fourth in 2015, and last in a narrower field of three candidates in 2017.

North Norfolk was described by the Earl of Leicester as "the one constituency in England where, in 1964, it was so feudal that it had to be explained to the electors that the ballot was secret." Feudal is used as a metaphor, or shorthand, meaning constitutionally backward.

Boundaries and boundary changes 

1868–1885: The Hundreds of East Flegg, West Flegg, Happing, Tunstead, Erpingham (North), Erpingham (South), Eynsford, Holt and North Greenhoe.

The seat was formed largely from northern parts of the abolished Eastern Division, with a small part transferred from the Western Division.  It also absorbed the Parliamentary Borough of Great Yarmouth, which had been disenfranchised for corruption under the Act.

1885–1918: The Sessional Divisions of Eynsford, Holt, North Erpingham, and North Greenhoe, and part of the Sessional Division of South Erpingham.

Great Yarmouth re-established as a single-member Parliamentary Borough.  Eastern parts were transferred to the newly constituted Eastern Division.

1918–1950: The Urban Districts of Cromer, Sheringham, and Wells-next-the-Sea, and the Rural Districts of Aylsham, Erpingham, and Walsingham.

The seat gained the area around Fakenham from the abolished North-Western Division of Norfolk, and lost small areas in the south to the Eastern and South-Western Divisions.

1950–1974: The Urban Districts of Cromer, North Walsham, Sheringham, and Wells-next-the-Sea, and the Rural Districts of Erpingham, Smallburgh, and Walsingham.

The seat gained North Walsham and the Rural District of Smallburgh from the abolished Eastern Division of Norfolk. An area comprising the former Rural District of Aylsham (now part of the St Faith's and Aylsham Rural District) was transferred to the new County Constituency of Central Norfolk.

1974–1983: The Urban Districts of Cromer, North Walsham, and Sheringham, and the Rural Districts of Erpingham, St Faith's and Aylsham, and Smallburgh.

The constituency gained the Rural District of St Faiths and Aylsham, including Hellesdon and Sprowston, from the abolished County Constituency of Central Norfolk. Wells-next-the-Sea and the Rural District of Walsingham, including Fakenham, were transferred to the new County Constituency of North West Norfolk.

1983–2010: The District of North Norfolk.

The seat was extended westwards, regaining Wells-next-the-Sea and areas comprising the former Rural District of Walsingham, including Fakenham, from North West Norfolk. Suburbs of Norwich, including Hellesdon and Sprowston, were transferred to Norwich North, and remaining southern areas, including Aylsham, to the new County Constituency of Mid Norfolk.

2010–present: The District of North Norfolk wards of Briston, Chaucer, Corpusty, Cromer Town, Erpingham, Gaunt, Glaven Valley, Happisburgh, High Heath, Holt, Hoveton, Mundesley, North Walsham East, North Walsham North, North Walsham West, Poppyland, Priory, Roughton, St Benet, Scottow, Sheringham North, Sheringham South, Stalham and Sutton, Suffield Park, The Runtons, Waterside, Waxham, and Worstead.

Fakenham and surrounding areas were transferred out once again to the new County Constituency of Broadland.

Members of Parliament

MPs 1868–1885

MPs since 1885

Elections

Elections in the 2010s
Sir Norman Lamb did not stand for re-election. The seat saw the largest decrease in the Liberal Democrat vote share at the 2019 general election, and the third highest increase in vote share for the Conservatives.

Elections in the 2000s

Elections in the 1990s

Elections in the 1980s

Elections in the 1970s

Elections in the 1960s

Elections in the 1950s

Election in the 1940s

Elections in the 1930s

Elections in the 1920s

Elections in the 1910s 

 King was named a Unionist candidate in the official list of Coalition Government endorsements, but he wrote to The Times stating he had left the party before the election and should be classed as an independent. He later rejoined the party.

General election 1914–15:
Another general election was required to take place before the end of 1915. The political parties had been making preparations for an election to take place and by the July 1914, the following candidates had been selected; 
Liberal: Noel Noel-Buxton
Unionist: Douglas King

Elections in the 1900s

Elections in the 1890s 

 Caused by Cozens-Hardy's appointment as a judge in the Chancery Division of the High Court of Justice.

Elections in the 1880s

Elections in the 1870s

 Caused by Duff's death.

 Caused by Walpole's death.

Elections in the 1860s

See also 
 List of parliamentary constituencies in Norfolk

Notes

References

Sources

Constituencies of the Parliament of the United Kingdom established in 1868
Parliamentary constituencies in Norfolk
North Norfolk